Diana Stöcker (born 19 May 1970) is a German politician of the Christian Democratic Union (CDU) who has been the Member of the German Bundestag for Lörrach – Müllheim since 2021.

Education 
Stöcker graduated from Saarland University and Newcastle University.

References 

Living people
1970 births
21st-century German women politicians
Female members of the Bundestag
Saarland University alumni
Alumni of Newcastle University
Members of the Bundestag for the Christian Democratic Union of Germany
Members of the Bundestag 2021–2025
Members of the Bundestag for Baden-Württemberg
Women mayors of places in Germany